Phoenix Engine may refer to:

 Phoenix Engine (Relic), a game engine developed by Relic Entertainment
 Phoenix Engine (Wolfire), a game engine developed by Wolfire for their recently fully released game Overgrowth